Ten Years After are a British blues rock group, most popular in the late 1960s and early 1970s. Between 1968 and 1973, the band had eight consecutive Top 40 albums on the UK Albums Chart. In addition, they had twelve albums enter the US Billboard 200. They are best known for tracks such as "I'm Going Home", "Hear Me Calling", "I'd Love to Change the World" and "Love Like a Man".

History

Formation: 1962–1966

The band's core formed in late 1960 as Ivan Jay and the Jaycats. After several years of local success in the Nottingham/Mansfield area, they changed their name to the Jaybirds in 1962 and later to Ivan Jay and the Jaymen. Ivan Jay (born Ivan Joseph Harrison, 1939, Nottingham, Nottinghamshire; died April 2009, USA) sang lead vocals from late 1960 to 1962 and was joined by Ric Lee in August 1965, replacing drummer Dave Quickmire (born David Quickmire, 1940, Mansfield, Nottinghamshire), who had replaced Pete Evans (born Peter Evans, 1940, Mansfield, Nottinghamshire) in 1962. Roy Cooper (born 11 November 1943, Huthwaite, Nottinghamshire) played rhythm guitar, and did vocals from 1960 to 1962. The Jaybirds moved to London to back the Ivy League in 1966. In the same year, Chick Churchill joined the group as keyboard player. That November, the quartet signed a manager, Chris Wright, and changed their name to Blues Trip. Using the name Blues Yard they played one show at the Marquee Club supporting the Bonzo Dog Doo-Dah Band. Alvin Lee and Leo Lyons again changed their name in 1966 to Ten Years After – in honour of Elvis Presley, one of Lee's idols. (This was ten years after Presley's successful year, 1956). Some sources claim that the name was pulled by Leo Lyons from a magazine, advertising a book, Suez Ten Years After (referring to the Suez Crisis).

Ten Years After: 1967–1974
The group was the first act booked by the soon-to-be Chrysalis Agency. It secured a residency at the Marquee, and was invited to play at the Windsor Jazz Festival in 1967. That performance led to a contract with Deram, a subsidiary of Decca — the first band Deram signed without a hit single. In October 1967 they released the self-titled debut album, Ten Years After. In 1968, after touring Scandinavia and the United States, Ten Years After released a second album, the live Undead, with a first version of the noteworthy song, "I'm Going Home". They followed this in February 1969 by the studio issue Stonedhenge, a British hit that included another well-known track, "Hear Me Calling", which was also released as a single. (In 1972, this song was covered by the British glam rock rising stars, Slade.) In July 1969, the group appeared at the Newport Jazz Festival, in the first event rock bands were invited to. Between 26 and 27 July 1969, they appeared at the Seattle Pop Festival held at Gold Creek Park. On 17 August, the band performed a breakthrough American appearance at Woodstock; their rendition of "I'm Going Home" featuring Alvin Lee as lead singer/lead guitar, was featured in both the subsequent film and soundtrack album and catapulted them to star status.  In 1970, Ten Years After released "Love Like a Man", the group's only hit in the UK Singles Chart, where it peaked at #10. It was the first record issued with a different playing speed on each side: a three-minute edit at 45 rpm, and a nearly eight-minute live version at 33 rpm. The full studio version song appeared on the band's fifth album, their most successful in Britain, Cricklewood Green. In August 1970, they played the Strawberry Fields Festival near Toronto, and the Isle of Wight Festival 1970.

In 1971, the band switched labels to Columbia Records (US) and Chrysalis (UK) and released the hit album A Space in Time, which marked a move toward more commercial material. It featured the group's biggest hit, "I'd Love to Change the World". In late 1972, the group issued their second Columbia album Rock & Roll Music to the World and, in 1973, the live double album Ten Years After Recorded Live. The band subsequently broke up after their final 1974 Columbia album, Positive Vibrations.

Break up and reformation
In the second half of the 1970s and early 1980s, Alvin actively toured with a new band he called Ten Years Later. The original Ten Years After reunited in 1983 to play the Reading Festival, and this performance was later released on CD as The Friday Rock Show Sessions – Live at Reading '83' .

Reunion, split with Alvin Lee and Leo Lyons: 1988–present

In 1988, the members reunited for a few concerts and recorded the album About Time (1989) with producer Terry Manning in Memphis. They stayed together for their longest continuous period, until 2003, however without releasing new material. In 1994, they participated in the Eurowoodstock festival in Budapest. In 2003, the other band members replaced Alvin Lee with Joe Gooch, and recorded the album, Now. Material from the following tour was used for the 2005 double album, Roadworks. Alvin Lee mostly played and recorded under his own name following his split from the band. He died from complications during a routine medical procedure on 6 March 2013. Ric Lee is also currently in a band called Ric Lee's Natural Born Swingers, along with Bob Hall. In January 2014, it was announced that both Gooch and Lyons had left Ten Years After. Two months later, veteran bass player Colin Hodgkinson and singer/guitarist Marcus Bonfanti were announced as their replacements. In October 2017, the band released its most recent studio album, A Sting in the Tale.

Band members

Current members
 Chick Churchill – keyboards (1966–1974, 1983, 1988–present)
 Ric Lee – drums (1966–1974, 1983, 1988–present)
 Marcus Bonfanti – guitar, vocals (2014–present)
 Colin Hodgkinson – bass (2014–present)

Former members
 Alvin Lee – guitar, vocals, harp (1966–1974, 1983, 1988–2003; died 2013)
 Leo Lyons – bass (1966–1974, 1983, 1988–2014)
 Joe Gooch – guitar, vocals (2003–2014)

Timeline

Discography

Ten Years After (1967)
Stonedhenge (1969)
Ssssh (1969)
Cricklewood Green (1970)
Watt (1970)
A Space in Time (1971)
Rock & Roll Music to the World (1972)
Positive Vibrations (1974)
About Time (1989)
Now (2004)
Evolution  (2008)
A Sting in the Tale  (2017)

Bibliography
 The New Musical Express Book of Rock, Star Books, 1975. .
 
 Alvin Lee and Ten Years After – Visual History – Herb Staehr, Free Street Press, 2001.

References

External links

 
 The original Ten Years After website 
 
 

1966 establishments in England
Chrysalis Records artists
Columbia Records artists
Decca Records artists
Deram Records artists
English blues rock musical groups
English hard rock musical groups
Musical groups from Nottingham
Musical groups disestablished in 1974
Musical groups established in 1966
Musical groups reestablished in 1988